A railcar mover is a road–rail vehicle (capable of travelling on both roads and rail tracks) fitted with couplers for moving small numbers of railroad cars around in a rail siding or small yard.  Vollert has developed an unmanned road-rail remote controlled vehicle VLEX for shunting up to 300 t.

See also 
 Road–rail vehicle
 Unimog

References

Rail and road vehicle